Kyle Lennon Barker (born 16 December 2000) is an English footballer who plays as a midfielder for  club Peterborough Sports.

Career
Barker joined the Peterborough United academy at the age of 13, signing his first professional contract in March 2019. Under 18s manager Matthew Etherington stated Barker had "a lot of ability, plays the game in a certain way, [he's] very calm on the pitch as well as off it and is very good in possession". The midfielder started against Arsenal Under-21s and Cambridge United in the EFL Trophy in 2019. Barker also appeared on the bench against Gillingham in a League One fixture in October 2019.

On 19 February 2020, Barker joined Wrexham on loan for the remainder of the 2019–20 season, but would only manage one game with the club before the season ended due to the COVID-19 pandemic.

Barker would sign a new two-year deal with Peterborough in 2021. Despite this, Barker would leave the club after the end of the following season.

Barker played two matches as a trialist for Scottish Championship team Dundee in July 2022 against Montrose and Blackburn Rovers.

Career Statistics

References

2000 births
Living people
People from King's Lynn
English footballers
Association football midfielders
Peterborough United F.C. players
Kettering Town F.C. players
Lowestoft Town F.C. players
Wrexham A.F.C. players
English Football League players